The Deputy Judge Advocate General of the Navy (DJAG) is the second-highest ranking JAG officer and lawyer in the United States Navy. As part of the Judge Advocate General’s Corps, the DJAG also serves as Deputy Department of Defense Representative for Ocean Policy Affairs.

The DJAG was previously dual-hatted as Commander, Naval Legal Service Command (CNLSC), until the position was separated into a distinct position in 2021. Darse E. Crandall Jr. was the last DJAG to serve in both positions simultaneously.

Appointment
Similar to the Judge Advocate General of the Navy (JAG), the DJAG is appointed by the President with the advice and consent of the Senate. The DJAG may be chosen from judge advocates of the Navy and Marine Corps who have the qualifications prescribed for the JAG. Upon appointment to the office of DJAG, the appointee, if they hold a lower rank, will be promoted to the rank of rear admiral or major general, as appropriate.

Recent Deputy Judge Advocates General of the Navy

See also
Staff Judge Advocate to the Commandant of the Marine Corps

References

External links
U.S. Navy Judge Advocate General's Corps official website

United States Navy Judge Advocate General's Corps
DJ
United States Navy, Deputy